Yael Grobglas (born ) is a French-Israeli actress, best known for her roles as Petra Solano on The CW's television series Jane the Virgin.

Her first major role was in three seasons of the Israeli sci-fi TV series Ha'i (English: The Island, 2007–09), which established her popularity among Israel's teenage audiences. She gained recognition for her debut film role in the first Israeli horror film Rabies (translit. Kalevet, 2010), which participated in the Tribeca Film Festival, and a number of other venues internationally. Through 2010–11 Grobglas performed a number of lead and supporting roles in prime time Israeli television shows, including in the sitcom Ha-Shualim (English: The Foxes 2010), Ramzor (English: Traffic Light, Hebrew: רמזור), and Hatzuya (2011) (English: Split, Hebrew: חצויה). Grobglas is also known for her role as "The Girl" in the interactive video of We the Kings "Say You Like Me". and as Gabi in the popular Israeli series Tanuhi (Hebrew: תנוחי, English: Relax, 2012). It was announced on 22 February 2013 that the actress was cast in the lead role of "America Singer" in The CW's second pilot for The Selection, though that was ultimately not picked up as a television series. That same year, Grobglas was cast for The CW's's Reign as Olivia, an Italian born noblewoman who is an old flame of Prince Francis (Toby Regbo).

Early life 
Grobglas was born in Paris. Her father Jean Pierre Grobglas is from a French-Jewish family.  Her mother Eva (Rosner) was a Christian from Austria who converted to Judaism. In 1986, when Grobglas was two years old, the family immigrated to Israel and resided in the city of Ra'anana, Israel.

Her talent and passion for performing arts became visible even as a young girl. As a teenager, Grobglas studied and performed in professional dance and ballet groups. She later led a brief modelling career and participated in a number of runway shows and advertising campaigns. Eventually having realized a greater interest in acting, Grobglas graduated from the Yoram Loewenstein Performing Arts Studio in Tel Aviv, Israel.

Career 
In 2007, Grobglas was cast to her first major role for the Israeli sci-fi series Ha'Yi ("The Island"), which made her popular among Israel's young audiences. Following two consecutive seasons of the show Grobglas enrolled in a full-time three-year acting program at the Yoram Loewenstein Performing Arts Studio. She completed the third season of Ha'Yi in 2010, and was cast for a number of major commercials during the course of her studies.

In 2010, Grobglas gained international recognition when she starred in the first Israeli horror film Rabies ("Kalevet"). She was part of the main cast of the Israeli sitcom Ha-Shualim ("The Foxes"). Grobglas also played the role of Linda Christie in a Beersheba Theater adaptation of Play It Again, Sam.

In 2012, Grobglas was cast to the Israeli comedy-drama series Tanuchi ("Chill").

In 2013, Grobglas starred as America Singer in the CW's The Selection pilot, described as a cross between The Bachelor and The Hunger Games, but it was ultimately not picked up to series. In the same year, she began the recurring role of Olivia D'Amencourt in the CW's series Reign.

In 2014, Grobglas was cast as Petra, one of the main characters on the CW's Jane the Virgin. When describing her experience as Petra to the New York Times, Grobglas said, "I'm usually cast for the more goofy and tomboyish characters [...] I'm having a wonderful time playing someone so complex and layered and funny." "She's calculating, resourceful and manipulative," she said. "But even though I don't agree with the decisions she makes, you have to admire her. It's been a blast playing such a mischievous character because she's so unlike me." In January 2015, Time magazine stated that "Grobglas [...] has turned Petra into one of television's most amusingly complex comic villains. Fans love to hate her, yet as Jane delves deeper into Petra's backstory – and shows off her lighter side – they're starting to love her as well." In March 2016, TVLine gave Grobglas an honorable mention for her performance in Jane the Virgin Chapter 36: "Leave it to Jane the Virgin's unsung MVP Yael Grobglas to turn the painful process of giving birth – to twins, no less! – into a comedic tour de force ... After witnessing Grobglas' impeccable ability to mix humor and emotion, we can't wait to see what challenges (and laughs) motherhood will bring for her character."

In 2015, Grobglas starred along Yon Tumarkin and Danielle Jadelyn in JeruZalem, an English-language Israeli horror film.

Personal life 
Yael Grobglas has mentioned she has a strong passion for food, cooking and hosting dinner parties in her spare time. She is personally against eating meat and in 2012 she became a pescetarian before moving to the United States.

Grobglas is married to Israeli businessman Artem Kroupenev, her high school sweetheart.

On 22 September 2019, Grobglas announced on Instagram that she was expecting her first child. On 17 January 2020, she announced that she had given birth to a baby girl, Arielle.

Filmography

Stage

Music video

References

External links 

 
 

Living people
Israeli Ashkenazi Jews
Israeli people of Austrian-Jewish descent
Israeli people of French-Jewish descent
Israeli people of Polish-Jewish descent
Israeli television actresses
Israeli film actresses
Jewish Israeli actresses
People from Ra'anana
Actresses from Paris
French emigrants to Israel
21st-century French actresses
21st-century Israeli actresses
1984 births